The Constant is the fourth studio album by American rock band Story of the Year. It was released on February 16, 2010, through Epitaph Records and, like the band's previous record, was produced by Michael "Elvis" Baskette who has also produced albums by Alter Bridge, Chevelle, Escape the Fate, blessthefall, Fact, and A Change of Pace. This was the last studio album to feature bassist Adam Russell who left the band in 2014. Russell would rejoin the band in 2018.

Background and recording
In May 2009, guitarist Ryan Phillips revealed that the band were in the writing process for their next album.

The Constant was recorded at Studio  in Bavon, Virginia, with producer Michael Baskette and engineer Dave Holdredge. Jef Mall did digital editing, while Casey White acted as studio assistant. Baskette and Holdredge mixed the recordings, which were then mastered by Ted Jensen at Sterling Sound.

Composition
Frontman Dan Marsala explained that the album title symbolizes the band's work ethic and commitment to both themselves and their fans. "Music is the constant thing in life for us," he said. "When I go to bed I think about music and when I wake up it's the first thing on my mind. The Constant can mean anything; hopefully our band will go on forever and we want music to remain a constant thing in our lives no matter what."

Release
In November and December 2009, the band went on a US tour with the Devil Wears Prada, All That Remains and Haste the Day. "To the Burial" was posted on the band's Myspace profile on December 7, 2009. On December 10, Russell and Phillips premiered "I'm Alive" from the album on the Point radio station. The band released "I'm Alive" as a single on January 1, 2010. On January 6, 2010, The Constant was announced for release the following month; alongside this, its artwork and track listing were posted online. "I'm Alive" was released to alternative radio on February 2. The Constant was made available for streaming on Myspace on February 10, 2010, before it was released on February 16, 2010 through Epitaph Records. In was promoted with a tour of the Southern US states in March and April 2010; the trek included an appearance at the Extreme Thing festival. 

On August 9, 2010, the band announced that the next single off the record will be "The Dream Is Over". In late September and early October 2011, the band toured Australia as part of the Soundwave Counter-Revolution festival.

Reception

The album debuted at #42 on the Billboard 200 charts with sales of 14,115.

Track listing
All lyrics written by Dan Marsala and Adam Russell, all music composed by Story of the Year.

Personnel
Personnel per booklet.

Story of the Year
 Dan Marsala – lead vocals
 Ryan Phillips - guitar
 Philip Sneed – guitar, vocals, keys, synthesizers
 Adam Russell – bass
 Josh Wills – drums, percussion

Additional musicians
 Dave Holdredge – strings, string arrangements
 Kalei Sneed – children's choir (track 1)
 Sydney Baskette – children's choir (track 1)
 Alexis Baskette – children's choir (track 1)
 The Bookworms – gang vocals

Production and design
 Michael "Elvis" Baskette – producer, mixing
 Dave Holdredge – mixing, engineer
 Jef Mall – digital editing
 Casey White – studio assistant
 Ted Jensen – mastering
 Nick Pirtchard – art, design, cover photo
 Tim Harman – band photo
 Josh Wills – subway photo

Charts

References

External links

The Constant at YouTube (streamed copy where licensed)

2010 albums
Story of the Year albums
Epitaph Records albums
Albums produced by Michael Baskette